Li Xinyi (born 14 June 1962) is a Chinese former professional tennis player. She was a singles gold medalist at the 1986 Asian Games in Seoul.

Li was a regular member of China's Federation Cup team during the 1980s, featuring in a total of 13 ties, for four singles and three doubles wins. Her four wins in singles included victories over Brazil's Niege Dias and Etsuko Inoue of Japan. In 1986 she played a Federation Cup rubber against Martina Navratilova in Prague, which was the first time the adopted American had played in her birth country since defecting.

On the WTA Tour, Li played in the main draw of two tournaments, the 1987 Singapore Women's Open and 1988 Lipton International Players Championships in Florida. She reached a best singles ranking of 407 in the world.

ITF finals

Singles: 2 (2–0)

Doubles: 6 (2–4)

See also
List of China Fed Cup team representatives

References

External links
 
 
 

1962 births
Living people
Chinese female tennis players
Asian Games medalists in tennis
Asian Games gold medalists for China
Medalists at the 1986 Asian Games
Tennis players at the 1986 Asian Games
20th-century Chinese women